Allan MacLeod Cormack (February 23, 1924 – May 7, 1998) was a South African American physicist who won the 1979 Nobel Prize in Physiology or Medicine (along with Godfrey Hounsfield) for his work on X-ray computed tomography (CT).

Early life and education
Cormack was born in Johannesburg, South Africa. He attended Rondebosch Boys' High School in Cape Town, where he was active in the debating and tennis teams. He received his B.Sc. in physics in 1944 from the University of Cape Town and his M.Sc. in crystallography in 1945 from the same institution. He was a doctoral student at Cambridge University from 1947–49, and while at Cambridge he met his future wife, Barbara Seavey, an American physics student.

Career
After marrying Barbara, he returned to the University of Cape Town in early 1950 to lecture. Following a sabbatical at Harvard in 1956-57, the couple agreed to move to the United States, and Cormack became a professor at Tufts University in the fall of 1957. Cormack became a naturalized citizen of the United States in 1966. Although he was mainly working on particle physics, Cormack's side interest in x-ray technology led him to develop the theoretical underpinnings of CT scanning. This work was initiated at the University of Cape Town and Groote Schuur Hospital in early 1956 and continued briefly in mid-1957 after returning from his sabbatical. His results were subsequently published in two papers in the Journal of Applied Physics in 1963 and 1964. These papers generated little interest until Hounsfield and colleagues built the first CT scanner in 1971, taking Cormack's theoretical calculations into a real application.  For their independent efforts, Cormack and Hounsfield shared the 1979 Nobel Prize in Physiology or Medicine. It is notable that the two built a very similar type of device without collaboration in different parts of the world [3]. He was member of the International Academy of Science, Munich. In 1990, he was awarded the National Medal of Science.

Death
Cormack died of cancer in Winchester, Massachusetts at age 74. He was posthumously awarded the Order of Mapungubwe on the 10 December 2002 for outstanding achievements as a scientist and for co-inventing the CT scanner.

References

External links

 

1924 births
1998 deaths
Alumni of Rondebosch Boys' High School
Alumni of St John's College, Cambridge
American biophysicists
American Nobel laureates
Deaths from cancer in Massachusetts
Harvard University faculty
National Medal of Science laureates
Nobel laureates in Physiology or Medicine
People from Johannesburg
People from Winchester, Massachusetts
South African emigrants to the United States
South African inventors
South African Nobel laureates
20th-century South African physicists
Tufts University faculty
Academic staff of the University of Cape Town
University of Cape Town alumni
X-ray computed tomography
White South African people
South African people of Scottish descent
Members of the United States National Academy of Sciences
Fellows of the American Physical Society
Members of the National Academy of Medicine